Tivonge Sacha Rushesha (born 24 July 2002) is a Welsh professional footballer who plays as a midfielder for Swansea City.

Club career
Rushesha made his Swansea City debut on 28 August 2019 as a second-half substitute in a 6–0 EFL Cup win against Cambridge United.

International career
Rushesha was born in Zimbabwe, but he moved to the United Kingdom with his family in 2003. He has represented Wales at under-17's level. In October 2018 he played against Kazakhstan and Portugal in the 2019 UEFA European Under-17 Championship qualifiers.

References

External links
 
 

2002 births
Living people
Association football defenders
Welsh footballers
Zimbabwean footballers
Swansea City A.F.C. players
Wales youth international footballers
Zimbabwean emigrants to the United Kingdom
Welsh people of Zimbabwean descent
Black British sportspeople